, also known as The Badminton Play of Ayano Hanesaki! or Hanebad!, is a Japanese sports manga series by Kōsuke Hamada. It was serialized in Kodansha's seinen manga magazine good! Afternoon from June 7, 2013 to October 7, 2019, and has been collected in sixteen tankōbon volumes. An anime television series adaptation by Liden Films aired from July 2018 to October 2018.

Plot
In the sporting world of badminton, Uchika Hanesaki was a reigning champion. Her daughter Ayano would follow her mother and trained with Uchika for many years. One day in her middle school Ayano caught a cold before an important badminton match and subsequently lost, causing Uchika to leave her and Ayano to be raised by her grandparents. Her mother leaving resulted in Ayano being depressed and stopped playing badminton at a competitive level. Now as Ayano is in her first year in high school, she is recruited by former player Kentaro Tachibana to join the badminton club. While there, she learns to overcome her fears from playing badminton again.

Characters

Kitakomachi High School

 A first year in high school and a shy badminton player. When she is spoken to, Elena often comes on her side. In one instance; When Kentaro was scouting for badminton members to join the team's club, while he saw Ayano climbed up a tree.  

 A third year in high school and the team's badminton captain.

 A third year in high school and the team's vice-captain.

 A first year in high school and the badminton club's manager as well as Ayano's childhood friend, and classmate.

The coach of the women's badminton club.  

The badminton club's advisor.

Konan High School

 Ayano's rival during their middle school days and a member of the Konan High School badminton club.

Fredericia Girls High School

 A badminton player from Denmark, who was trained by Uchika Hanesaki and a member of the Fredericia girls badminton club. She meets Ayano by a river, after she ran away from the training camp. They went by a flower shop to look around. When Ayano's phone rang, she overheard her name on the phone, which surprised Connie.  

 A third year and the captain of a rival high school badminton club, Fredericia.

Zushi Sogo High School

 She was Riko's middle school friend and a semifinalist from a past badminton tournament.

Others

 A retired badminton champion and Ayano's mother. Before she retired, her name was Uchika Shindo.

Media

Manga

Written and illustrated by Kōsuke Hamada, Hanebado! was serialized in the manga anthology good! Afternoon from June 7, 2013 to October 7, 2019. The chapters were collected and released in the tankōbon format by Kodansha. As of November 7, 2019, sixteen volumes were released.

Novel
A novel was released on June 29, 2018. The story begins a year before the events in the manga.

Anime

An anime television series adaptation aired from July 2 to October 1, 2018, on Tokyo MX and other channels. It ran for 13 episodes. The series is directed by Shinpei Ezaki and written by Taku Kishimoto, with animation by Liden Films. Satoshi Kimura provided the character designs, and Tatsuya Kato composed the music.

The production was affected by the 2018 Hokkaido earthquake: the photography studio is located in Sapporo and was without power following the earthquake, making it impossible for the staff to continue working until electricity is fully restored. As a result, episode 11 of the show was delayed, with a new broadcast date yet to be decided. The show resumed on September 17, 2018 after being delayed for a week.

The series were simulcast worldwide outside Asia by Crunchyroll with English subtitles, and in North America, the British Isles and Australasia by Funimation with an English dub.

Reception
The manga series has over 1.6 million volumes in print.

Notes

References

External links
 

2018 Japanese novels
Anime series based on manga
Badminton mass media
Crunchyroll anime
Funimation
Kodansha manga
Kodansha Ranobe Bunko
Liden Films
Seinen manga
Sports anime and manga
Toho Animation